Sin Rip (sometimes romanized as Shin Rip or Shin Rib) (Hangul: 신립, Hanja: 申砬; 16 November 1546 – 7 June 1592) was a Korean general and a member of the Pyeongsan Sin clan.

Biography 
He passed the Korean national military examinations at the age of 22. Sin earned prominence by driving out the Nitanggae barbarians from the northern provinces of Joseon dynasty. Sin was a successful general who also gained renown for protecting the borders of Joseon against the Jurchen. When the fortifications at Busan fell to the Japanese at the outset of the Japanese invasions of Korea (1592–1598), Sin Rip, the Vice Minister of War, was despatched to Chungju to stop the advancing invaders. He raised a substantial force, 8,000 strong, consisting primarily of cavalry. He was joined at Chungju by Gyeongsang Provincial Governor Kim Su, who had previously collected a large force at Daegu while waiting for a general to be sent from the capital, Hanseong (modern day Seoul). When no general materialized and it was learned that the Japanese were en route, Kim's force largely evaporated.

Sin Rip was en route to the Choryeong Stronghold to block the Choryeong Pass which the Japanese would have to use to move north when he learned that Yi Il's forces had been routed at Sangju by Konishi Yukinaga's First Division and that General Yi had fled, he decided to remain at Chungju and fight the Japanese on level terrain to better employ his cavalry.

This, however, left a key choke point undefended and facilitated Konishi's forces' advance northward.  Sin selected a large, natural amphitheater at a place called Tangeumdae (탄금대), with mountains at one side and a curving river at the other to make his stand. The only approaches were two narrow passages at either end where the mountains met the river.  Apparently Sin chose this site thinking to best employ his cavalry against a Japanese enemy that was predominantly infantry.

Modern analysts have also theorized that Sin, in light of reports of Korean forces fleeing in the heat of battle, may have contrived to lock his troops into a life or death situation where they would be forced to fight for their very survival. In the battle, Sin Rip was up against great odds. The Japanese, moreover, were equipped with a type of musket, arquebus, which Sin had not seen in action. The Japanese outnumbered the Korean cavalry by more than 2:1 (18,700 to 8,000) and Sin's cavalry were largely raw recruits plus some scattered remnants of defeated forces from the south.

On June 6, 1592, Konishi's troops advanced to crush Sin's forces. The Japanese blocked both the narrow entrances and then sent musketeers and archers to rain down a withering hail of musket balls and arrows on the Korean forces. Suddenly aware of their tactical disadvantage, many of the Korean forces broke ranks and frantically tried to escape through one or the other of the passages, but were either cut down by the Japanese or drowned in the river.  A few broke through the Japanese lines and fled.  Sin and his officers escaped but committed suicide rather than being taken prisoner by the Japanese.

Family
Although Sin Rip and Sin Heum were 12th cousins, they each became in-laws of King Seonjo through their children.

Father – Sin Hwa-guk (신화국, 申華國)
Grandfather – Sin Sang (신상, 申鏛)
Mother – Lady Yun of the Papyeong Yun clan (정경부인 파평 윤씨, 貞敬夫人 坡平 尹氏); (윤회, 尹懷)
Grandfather – Yun Hoe (윤회, 尹懷)
Siblings

 Older sister – Shin Ji-hyang, Internal Princess Consort Pyeongsan of the Pyeongsan Shin clan (신지향 평산부부인 평산 신씨, 申芝香 平山府夫人 平山 申氏) (1538–1662); Gu Sa-maeng’s second wife
 Brother-in-law – Gu Sa-maeng, Duke Munui, Internal Prince Neungan (1531–1604) (구사맹 문의공 능안부원군)
Niece – Queen Inheon of the Neungseong Gu clan (17 April 1578 – 14 January 1626) (인헌왕후 구씨)
Nephew-in-law – Wonjong of Joseon (2 August 1580 – 2 February 1619)
 Older brother – Sin Jab (신잡, 申磼) (1541–1609)
 Unnamed sister-in-law
 Nephew – Sin Gyeong-ji (신경지, 申景祉)
 Grandnephew – Sin Jong-geon (신종건, 申從謇)
 Grandnephew – Sin Jong-geun (신종근, 申從謹)
 Older brother – Sin Geup (신급, 申礏)
 Younger brother – Sin Hal (신할, 申硈)

Wives and their respective issue:

 Lady Yi (이씨) – No issue.
 Lady Choe (최씨, 崔氏); daughter of Choe Pil-sin (최필신, 崔弼臣)
 Son – Sin Gyeong-jin (신경진, 申景禛) (1575–1643)
 Daughter-in-law – Lady Choe of the Jeonju Choe clan (전주 최씨, 全州 崔氏) 
 Grandson – Shin Jun (신준, 申埈)
 Grandson – Shin Hae (신해, 申垓)
 Great-grandson – Sin Yeo-jeong (신여정, 申汝挺)
 Great-grandson – Sin Yeo-sik (신여식, 申汝拭)
 Great-grandson – Sin Yeo-seok (신여석, 申汝晳)
 Great-grandson – Sin Yeo-cheol (신여철, 申汝哲)
 Granddaughter – Lady Sin of the Pyeongsan Sin clan (평산 신씨)
 Grandson-in-law – Yu U-yeop (유우엽, 柳于燁)
 Granddaughter – Lady Sin of the Pyeongsan Sin clan (평산 신씨)
 Grandson-in-law – Bak Cheon-gu (박천구, 朴天球)
 Son – Sin Gyeong-yu (신경유, 申景裕)
 Son – Sin Gyeong-in (신경인, 申景禋)
 Daughter – Princess Consort Sin of the Pyeongsan Sin clan (군부인 평산 신씨, 郡夫人 平山申氏) (1578–1622)
 Son-in-law – Yi Hu, Prince Sinseong (신성군 이후) (6 January 1579 – 8 December 1592)
 Adoptive grandson – Yi Jeon, Grand Prince Neungchang (능창대군 이전) (16 July 1599 – 17 November 1615)
 Adoptive grandson – Yi Gu, Prince Pyeongun (평운군 이구) (1624–1662)
 Granddaughter – Lady Yi of the Jeonju Yi clan (전주 이씨, 全州 李氏)
 Grandson-in-law – Ahn Hong-ryang (안홍량, 安弘量) of the Juksan Ahn clan (죽산 안씨, 竹山安氏) (1590–1616)
 Daughter – Lady Sin of the Pyeongsan Sin clan (평산 신씨)
 Son-in-law – Yi Dae-yeop (이대엽, 李大燁) of the Gwangju Yi clan (광주 이씨, 廣州 李氏) (1587–1623)

See also
Battle of Sangju
Battle of Chungju
Korea
Japanese invasions of Korea (1592–98)

References

Nuneuro Boneun Hanguk Yeoksa, Joseon Junggi (눈으로 보는 한국역사, 조선중기), Vol. 7, Jungang Gyoyuk Yeonguweon (중앙교육연구원), Pg. 117.
Homer B. Hulbert, Hulbert's History of Korea, Vol. I, p. 356.
James Murdoch, A History of Japan, Vol. I, pp. 322–323.
William Ellsworth Henthorn, A History of Korea, p. 180.
Samuel Hawley, The Imjin War, pp. 152–158.
Stephen Turnbull, Samurai Invasion: Japan's Korea War 1592–1598, pp. 58–63.
Cho Byonghon, The Book of Corrections: Reflections on the National Crisis during the Japanese Invasion of Korea 1592–1598, pp. 67–70.

1546 births
1592 deaths
Korean generals
People of the Japanese invasions of Korea (1592–1598)
16th-century Korean people
Sin clan of Pyongsan